Emilio Lechner (born 8 November 1940) is an Italian luger. He competed at the 1968 Winter Olympics and the 1972 Winter Olympics.

References

External links
 

1940 births
Living people
Italian male lugers
Olympic lugers of Italy
Lugers at the 1968 Winter Olympics
Lugers at the 1972 Winter Olympics